Rök is a parish located in Östergötland, Sweden. It is mostly known for being the location where the Rök runestone is kept.

Östergötland